Dave Fegidero (May 15, 1978 – October 2, 2007) was a Filipino footballer.

Education
Dave Fegidero attended Bacolod City National High School and helped Western Visayas in winning several titles at the Palarong Pambansa. He studied at the University of Negros Occidental – Recoletos as an athletic scholar for his college studies and attained a business degree from the institution.

Football career
He was part of the Philippine national team that participated at the 2000 Tiger Cup along with his brothers Norman and Joshua and cousin Troy Fegidero and at the 2002 FIFA World Cup qualifiers. He also has coached the De-La Salle Zobel team for two years.

Death
Dave Fegidero worked as an English teacher in Hat Yai, Thailand. He was later involved in a motorcycle accident and died late at night on October 2, 2007. He was set to participate at the 2007 Southeast Asian Games with the national futsal team.

References

External links
 
 

1978 births
2007 deaths
Filipino footballers
Philippines international footballers
Footballers from Negros Occidental
Filipino expatriate sportspeople in Thailand
Association football defenders
Road incident deaths in Thailand
Motorcycle road incident deaths